Piero Carini (March 6, 1921 – May 30, 1957) was a racing driver from Italy. He was born in Genoa and died in Saint-Étienne, France.

Racing career
 Carini finished third in the 1950 Modena Grand Prix, run that year to Formula Two rules, driving an OSCA. However, the car proved unreliable in 1951 but he achieved enough to be invited to join Scuderia Marzotto for 1952, to drive their Ferrari sports and Grand Prix cars. Despite only competing in two Grands Prix (debuting on 6 July 1952) and retiring from both, Carini did well enough to be signed by the works Ferrari team for 1953, effectively as a "junior" driver alongside Umberto Maglioli. However he only competed in the Italian Grand Prix and at the end of the season moved to Alfa Romeo for 1954, to drive their touring cars achieving class wins in the Mille Miglia, the Tour of Sicily and the Dolomite Cup.

In 1955 Carini drove a Ferrari to class wins at Dakar and Caracas, Venezuela, and an OSCA to a class win in the Targa Florio.

In 1957, driving in a sports car race, near Saint-Étienne, France, with a Ferrari Testa Rossa, Carini's car crossed the central reservation and collided with another competitor killing him instantly.

Complete Formula One World Championship results
(key)

References 

1921 births
1957 deaths
Italian racing drivers
Italian Formula One drivers
24 Hours of Le Mans drivers
Ferrari Formula One drivers
Racing drivers who died while racing
Sport deaths in France
World Sportscar Championship drivers
24 Hours of Spa drivers
Carrera Panamericana drivers